

About NSTS Malta
The National Student Travel Service (NSTS) is an organization dedicated to student and youth educational travel. It was founded under the auspices of the National Student Travel Foundation (NSTF), itself a not-for-profit non-governmental organization (NGO). NSTF organizes educational projects for self-development in European Affairs, Science and Innovation as well as English Language Courses (held at the NSTS English Language Institute - ELI).Read More

History of NSTS Malta

Dates of Establishment:

 1950 - Saw birth of international student travel movement in search for peace and international understanding
 1950 - Student unions set up international structures for cross border cooperation
 1954 - University students formed the Maltese Student Travel Department
 1963 - Reconstituted as The National Student Travel Service (Malta)
 1963 - Commenced first English Language Course for foreign non-English speakers in Malta
 1964 - Introduced host family accommodation for foreign students
 1966 - Operated first student charter flights to Rome and beyond
 1972 - Hosted first international student conference SATA
 1973 - Became full member of the Federation of International Youth Travel Organisations
 1977 - Reconstituted as National Student Travel Foundation (Malta)
 1977 - Agreement with Air Malta for student low cost flexible fares
 1978 - Leased Hibernia and converted into self-catering to replace hotel
 1979 - First companies and NSTS-STUDENT & YOUTH TRAVEL brand created
 1983 - Contracted private beach club facility NSTS-Aquacentre in Sliema
 1989 - Launched NSTF-Mini European Assembly European research project
 1989 - Founded the Federation of English Language Teaching Organisations (FELTOM)
 1992 - Full member of European Youth Card Association: EURO<26
 1994 - Moved English Language operations to new premises in Gzira (ELI)
 1996 - Opened branch office on University Campus
 1997 - Secured long term lease on Hibernia to convert into hostel
 1999 - Inaugurated fully refurbished Hibernia Residence and Hostel
 2001 - Full member of International Youth Hostel Federation
 2001 - Expanded and improved branch office on University Campus
 2001 - Secured ownership of property by University at Msida
 2002 - Received SKAL “Academic & Professional” Malta Tourism Award
 2003 - 40th Anniversary celebration: inaugurated NSTS 40 residence by the University
 2004 - 50th Anniversary celebration: secured ownership over English Language Institute premises
 2004 - Acquired ISO 9000:2001 certification
 2006 - Inaugurated Rafiki’s café bar, chill-out, self-expression, trade area

Schools

ELI- English Language Institute
 
Location: English Language Institute, 12, Taliana Lane, Gzira GZR1581, Malta
Student Capacity:
Minimum Age:
Class Size: 8
Student Computers: 10
Other Facilities: Internet Cafe, Wi-Fi, Library, Business Lounge, Student lounge, TV, Garden Area

English Language Courses

Intensive English Course
Lessons per Week: 20 or 25 or 30
Course Duration: Min 1 Week
Class Size: 6
Business English Course
Lessons per Week: 20 or 30
Course Duration: Min 1 Week
Class Size: 5
Intensive and Business English Course
Lessons per Week: 30 (20 lessons of General English and 10 lessons of Business English)
Course Duration: Min 1 Week
Class Size: 5
Summer Intensive Course
Lessons per Week: 20 or 25
Course Duration: Min 1 Week
Class Size: Max 15
Absorption Course
Lessons per Week: 10 to 40
Course Duration: Min 1 Week
Class Size: 1 to 1, or 1 to 2
Examination Preparation Course
Lessons per Week: 20 or 30
Course Duration: Min 1 Week
Class Size: 5

Teacher Training
The school in Malta is a TEFL accredited center which offers teacher training courses to obtain the internationally accredited TEFL certificate

Accommodation Properties in Malta

The NSTS Campus Residence and Hostel
Located in Msida, adjacent to the University of Malta sports complex, within 15 minutes by public transport to the capital city of Malta - Valletta, 10 minutes to the shopping centre of Sliema and the nightlife hub of St. Julian's. NSTS Campus Residence & Hostel consists of 98 rooms with a choice of 5 beds and 4 beds in original duplex format, 3 beds, 2 beds or 1 bed over three floors each room with a private shower and toilet facilities.   The NSTS Campus Residence & Hostel includes a large rear outdoor swimming pool with terrace and sun-bathing deck.

The NSTS Hibernia Residence and Hostel
Located in Sliema. 1 minute from the Seafront. Offers 1 to 8 bedded rooms. The 6 and 8 bedded are low-cost accommodation with separate rooms for males and females. Rooms have double-deck bunk beds, own locker and key for rucksack with shelf and rail, bedside shelf and night lamp, common wash-basins, showers, toilets in the ratio of 1:5 beds. With common dining room and kitchen facilities.

NSTF National Student Travel Foundation
The National Student Travel Foundation (NSTF) was founded in 1977. It was set up by the students of the University of Malta for their international educational formation and 30 years since its founding, it still finds its raison d’etre in the interest it brings to students of all ages. NSTF is a non-profit NGO which is directly in touch with a large number of Maltese students through the various educational programmes it organises each year. These programmes complement the educational efforts of local educational institutions at various levels. “Putting Young People First” is the philosophy that guides the National Student Travel Foundation which seeks to provide all students with a unique non-formal educational experience..Read More

Accreditation and Membership
Malta
FELTOM - Federation of English Language Teaching Organisations in Malta.
University of Malta - University of Malta Official Site.
Global
Moody - International Certification Agency.

Education in Malta